South Carolina Highway 153 (SC 153) is a  state highway, providing a major connection between U.S. Route 123 (US 123) and Interstate 85 (I-85), and also serving as a primary commercial corridor for the suburban Greenville community of Powdersville.

Route description
The route travels generally in a southeast to northwest direction, starting unsigned on Brown Road in western Greenville County. The highway almost immediately comes to an interchange with Southern Connector Toll Road (I-185).  The two-lane road crosses over the Saluda River into Anderson County where it then meets I-85 at exit 40.  From I-85 to US 123 in Pickens County, SC 153 is a four-lane road that is relatively developed with commercial land uses. Continuing north as a two-lane with turn median and flanked with a multi-use path, SC 153 ends at Saluda Dam Road.

History

Junction list

See also

References

External links

SC 153 at Virginia Highways' South Carolina Highways Annex

153
Transportation in Anderson County, South Carolina
Transportation in Greenville County, South Carolina
Transportation in Pickens County, South Carolina